is a Japanese football player. She plays for MyNavi Sendai Ladies. She played for Japan national team.

Club career
Goto was born in Suzuka on 27 July 1990. After graduating from high school, she joined Urawa Reds in 2009. The club won the L.League championship in 2009 and 2014. She was also selected MVP awards in 2014. She left the club end of 2016 season. She played 140 matches and scored 28 goals in L.League. In July 2017, she joined Spanish Primera División club Real Sociedad. In July 2018, she moved to Primera Nacional club Eibar. In July 2019, she moved to Segunda División Pro club Córdoba.

National team career
On 7 March 2008, when Goto was 17 years old, she debuted for Japan national team against Canada. In November, she was selected Japan U-20 national team for 2008 U-20 World Cup. She was also a member for 2010 U-20 World Cup. In September 2013, she was selected Japan national team again. She played at 2014 Asian Cup and Japan won the championship. She played 7 games and scored 2 goals for Japan until 2014.

National team statistics

International goals

References

External links

Real Sociedad

1990 births
Living people
Waseda University alumni
Association football people from Mie Prefecture
Japanese women's footballers
Japan women's international footballers
Nadeshiko League players
WE League players
Urawa Red Diamonds Ladies players
Mynavi Vegalta Sendai Ladies players
Expatriate women's footballers in Spain
Japanese expatriates in Spain
Women's association football forwards
Real Sociedad (women) players
Nadeshiko League MVPs